The Canton of Lury-sur-Arnon is a former canton situated in the Cher département and in the Centre region of France. It was disbanded following the French canton reorganisation which came into effect in March 2015. It consisted of 9 communes, which joined the canton of Mehun-sur-Yèvre in 2015. It had 6,281 inhabitants (2012).

Geography 
A farming area in the valley of the river Arnon, in the southern part of the arrondissement of Vierzon, centred on the town of Lury-sur-Arnon. The altitude varies from 95m at Méreau to 161m at Chéry, with an average altitude of 136m.

The canton comprised 9 communes:

Brinay
Cerbois
Chéry
Lazenay
Limeux
Lury-sur-Arnon
Méreau
Preuilly
Quincy

Population

See also 
 Arrondissements of the Cher department
 Cantons of the Cher department
 Communes of the Cher department

References

Lury-sur-Arnon
2015 disestablishments in France
States and territories disestablished in 2015